TooManyLeftHands is a Copenhagen-based Danish DJ and producer duo consisting of Anders K and Martin Nick. Their work is mainly in the House / Tech / Progressive / Deep genres.

Anders K is a successful Danish DJ who teamed up with club-owner, events organizer and producer Martin Nick for a duo releasing their own materials. The DJ duo named TooManyLeftHands or TMLH for short, debuted during the Copenhagen Fashion Week 2009. gaining residency at the Nasa club, and in October 2010 won the producer contest for Ibiza Style Magazine, and later started hosting in cooperation with Ibiza Global Radio and Pioneer.

In addition to collaborations with a number of artists like Nadia Gattas, Mike Hawkins and Alexander Brown, in 2014, they released "Dancing in the Fire" and "Trouble" both charting in Denmark. They have also remixed materials from Danish artists Darwich, Svenstrup & Vendelboe, Morten Breum, Sisse Marie and Rune RK.

The single "Paralyzed", which was released in cooperation with Sisse Marie was used in 2012 in the computer game The Sims 3.

Discography

Singles

Other singles and collaborations
2010: "Make Me Dance" (2010)
2010: "Flowing Over" (feat. Clara Sofie)
2012: "Paralyzed" (feat. Sisse Marie)
2013: "Survivor" (feat. Nadia Gattas)
2013: "EDM CPH" (feat. Mike Hawkins & Alexander Brown)
2013: "Sommer"

Featured in
2012: "Good Morning Copenhagen" (Simon Gain feat. Jay Adams & TooManyLeftHands)

References

External links
Facebook

Danish DJs
Danish record producers
Electronic dance music DJs